Sir John Ronald Leon, 4th Baronet (born 16 August 1934) is an English actor and baronet who is known as John Standing. He is the stepson of John Clements.

Early life
Standing was born in London, the son of Kay Hammond (née Dorothy Katherine Standing), an actress, and Sir Ronald George Leon, 3rd Baronet; a stockbroker descended from Sir Herbert Leon, the builder of Bletchley Park. 

He succeeded his father as the 4th baronet in 1964, but does not use the title. The Leon family were, until 1937, owners of Bletchley Park, the country house in Buckinghamshire used in the Second World War as a code-breaking centre. 

He was educated at Eton College and Millfield School, Somerset, later serving in the King's Royal Rifle Corps as a second lieutenant, before going to study at the Byam Shaw School of Art in London.

Career
He began his career in Peter Brook's 1955 production of Titus Andronicus starring Laurence Olivier and wife Vivien Leigh and later played leading parts in Oscar Wilde's The Importance of Being Earnest, Christopher Fry's Ring Round the Moon, A Sense of Detachment by John Osborne, and Noël Coward's Private Lives, with Maggie Smith. He was nominated for an Olivier award (1979) for Close of Play at the National Theatre. He made his film debut in The Wild and the Willing (1962), going on to appear in King Rat (1965), Walk, Don't Run (1966), The Psychopath (1966), The Eagle Has Landed (1976), The Elephant Man (1980), Nightflyers (1987), Mrs Dalloway (1997) and A Good Woman (2004).

One of his first major television roles was as Sidney Godolphin in the BBC twelve-part serial, The First Churchills (1969). Other television appearances include Tinker, Tailor, Soldier, Spy (1979); the ITV sitcom The Other 'Arf (1980–84), with Lorraine Chase; The Choir (1995) and King Solomon's Mines (2004). In the United States, he made guest appearances in numerous weekly programmes including L.A. Law, Civil Wars and Murder, She Wrote, and co-starred briefly with Robert Wagner and Samantha Smith in the action series Lime Street (1985). In 1976, he also appeared opposite Peter O'Toole in the little-seen BBC thriller film, Rogue Male, directed by Clive Donner.

He appeared in the horror film Nightflyers (1987) adapted from a short story by George R. R. Martin. In 2002, he had a speaking credit on Lost Horizons, the second studio album from the British electronic duo Lemon Jelly. On track 1, "Elements", he lists the basic 'elements' that make up the world: ash, metal, water, wood, fire and sky. On track 3, "Ramblin' Man", Standing reads a long list of various locations around the world, ranging from small Sussex villages to major world capitals.

In July 2010, it was confirmed that he would be appearing as Jon Arryn in the HBO series Game of Thrones, based on Martin's A Song of Ice and Fire novels.

Filmography

Film roles

 A Pair of Briefs (1962) – Hubert Shannon
 The Wild and the Willing (1962) – Arthur
 The Iron Maiden (1962) – Humphrey Gore-Brown
 Hot Enough for June (1964) – Men's Room Attendant (uncredited)
 King Rat (1965) – Daven
 The Psychopath (1966) – Mark Von Sturm
 Walk, Don't Run (1966) – Julius D. Haversack
 Torture Garden (1967) – Leo Winston (segment 3 "Mr. Steinway")
 A Touch of Love (1969) – Roger Henderson
 All the Right Noises (1971) – Nigel
 Zee and Co. (1972) – Gordon
 Au Pair Girls (1972) – Buster
 Rogue Male (1976) – Major Quive-Smith
 The Eagle Has Landed (1976) – Father Philip Verecker
 Space: 1999, The Mark of Archanon (1976) – Pasc
 The Legacy (1978) – Jason Mountolive
 The Class of Miss MacMichael (1978) – Charles Fairbrother
 The Sea Wolves (1980) – Finley
 The Elephant Man (1980) – Fox
 Privates on Parade (1983) – Captain Sholto Savory
 To Catch a King (1984, TV Movie) – Duke of Windsor
 The Young Visiters (1984) – Prince of Wales
 Invitation to the Wedding (1985) – Earl Harry
 Nightflyers (1987) – Michael D'Brannin
 Chaplin (1992) – Butler
 Mrs Dalloway (1997) – Richard Dalloway
 The Man Who Knew Too Little (1997) – Gilbert Embleton
 8½ Women (1999) – Philip Emmenthal
 Rogue Trader (1999) – Peter Baring
 Mad Cows (1999) – Politician
 Pandaemonium (2000) – Rev. Holland
 The Calling (2000) – Jack Plummer
 Queen's Messenger (2001) – Foreign Secretary
 Witness to a Kill (2001) – Foreign Secretary
 Shoreditch (2003) – Jenson Thackery
 Jack Brown and the Curse of the Crown (2004) – Sheldon Gotti
 A Good Woman (2004) – Dumby
 Animal (2005) – Dean Frydman
 V for Vendetta (2006) – Bishop Anthony Lilliman
 Lassie (2005) – French
 Scoop (2006) – Garden Party Guests
 Rabbit Fever (2006) – Ally's dad
 Outlaw (2007) – Captain Mardell
 I Want Candy (2007) – Michael de Vere
 Before the Rains (2007) – Charles Humphries
 Cheerful Weather for the Wedding (2012) – Horace Spigott
 Queen and Country (2014) – Grandfather George
 The Hippopotamus (2017) – Podmore
 The Happy Prince (2018) – Dr. Tucker

Television roles
 The Avengers (1963) – East
 The Saint (1963) – Gendarme
 Armchair Theatre (1964) – Siaru
 Danger Man (1965) – James
 The First Churchills (1969) – Sidney Godolphin
 Space: 1999 (1976) – Pasc
 Van der Valk (1977) – Ehrlich
 Tinker Tailor Soldier Spy (1979, TV Mini-Series) – Sam Collins
 Pygmalion (1983, TV Movie) – Col. Pickering
 Murder, She Wrote (1987–1990) – Chief Daniel Trent / Arthur Constable
 The Endless Game (1989) – Belfrage
 L.A. Law (1990) – Nigel Morris
 The Old Boy Network (1992) – Peter Duckham
 Riders (1993, TV Movie) – Malise Gordon
 Gulliver's Travels (1996, TV Mini-Series) – Admiral Bolgolam
 A Dance to the Music of Time (1997, TV Mini-Series) – Nicholas Jenkins
 NYPD Blue (2000) – Jimmy Cheatham
 The Real Jane Austen (2002) - Mr. Austen
 Midsomer Murders (2004) - Charles Rust - “Bad Tidings”
 The Line of Beauty (2006) – Lord Kessler
Midsomer Murders (2009) - Will Tunstall - “The Dogleg Murders”
 Game of Thrones (2011) (Episode: "Winter Is Coming") – Jon Arryn (corpse)
Agatha Christie’s Poirot (2013) - Colonel Toby Luttrell - “Curtain: Poirot’s Last Case”
 The Crown (2016) – Imbert-Terry

Arms

References

External links
 
 John Standing, photo, filmography, biography and awards; Juggle.com
 
 John Standing(Aveleyman)

1934 births
Alumni of the Byam Shaw School of Art
Baronets in the Baronetage of the United Kingdom
English male film actors
English male television actors
King's Royal Rifle Corps officers
Living people
People educated at Eton College
People educated at Millfield
Male actors from London
Standing family